The Regional Rail Revival is a joint initiative between the Australian federal government and the Victorian state government to upgrade all regional railway lines in Victoria. It is being delivered by Rail Projects Victoria (RPV). The project is guided by the 2016 Regional Network Development Plan, which outlines the short, medium and long-term priorities for a modernised regional rail network.

Projects
Regional Rail Revival is made up of multiple projects:
 Ararat Stabling
 Ballarat Line Upgrade (completed early 2021)
 track duplication between Deer Park West and Melton (length of ), and at Bacchus Marsh
 new Cobblebank station between Rockbank and Melton
 reconstruction of Rockbank Station
 upgrades to Bacchus Marsh, Ballan and Wendouree stations, including new platforms
 new train stabling facility at Maddingley
 passing loops at Ballan and Millbrook
 signal and track upgrades
 Bendigo and Echuca Line Upgrade
 modernised electronic train order (ETO) system from Bendigo to Swan Hill and Echuca
 upgrades to ten level crossings between Eaglehawk and Bendigo with improved train detection technology
 track upgrades on the Echuca Line, which will increase the maximum train speed on the line.
 new stations at Huntly, Goornong, and Raywood. Goornong and Raywood stations were previously closed in 1979 and 1981 respectively.
 potential reopening of Harcourt railway station (planning)
 Donnybrook and Wallan station upgrades
 Geelong Line Upgrade
 track duplication between South Geelong and Waurn Ponds
 upgrades to South Geelong, Marshall and Waurn Ponds stations
 new train maintenance and stabling facility at Waurn Ponds
 level crossing removals
 Armstrong Creek corridor extension (planning)
 Gippsland Line Upgrade
 new rail bridge over the Avon River in Stratford (completed)
 upgrades to Bunyip, Longwarry, Morwell and Traralgon stations, including new platforms
 track duplication at Bunyip and Longwarry
 extension of the Morwell crossing loop
 level crossing and signalling upgrades
 drainage structure upgrades
 Murray Basin Rail Project
 North-East Line Upgrade
 introduction of VLocity trains on the line for the first time {completed December 2021}
 Shepparton Line Upgrade
 Warrnambool Line Upgrade (Stage 1)
 upgrades to 12 level crossings with improved train detection technology (completed)
 signalling upgrades
 new crossing loop at Boorcan
 Warrnambool Line Upgrade (Stage 2)
 upgrades to more than 50 level crossings with improved train detection technology
 stabling upgrade at Warrnambool station
 introduction of VLocity trains on the line for the first time

Construction

Timeline

 27 October 2017 - Construction as part of Ballarat Line Upgrade commences.
 3 November 2017 - New station at Toolern (now Cobblebank), on Melton Line, announced.
 20 December 2017 - Wendouree Station upgrade announced.
 14 March 2018 - Geotechnical investigations begin to be carried out on the Gippsland Line.
 19 July 2018 - Ballan station upgrade plans revealed.
 22 October 2018 -Construction commences on Shepparton Station stabling facility.
 30 May 2019 - Construction begins as part of Donnybrook Station and Wallan Station upgrades.
 Early July 2019 - Total work time as a part of the Ballarat Line Upgrade hits 1,000,000 hours.
 26 August 2019 - Construction at Rockbank Station finishes, and the station is opened up to the public.
 20 November 2019 - Construction of the new Avon River railbridge in Stratford commences.
 1 December 2019- New station at Toolern, named Cobblebank, opens to public.
 6 December 2019 - Construction begins on stabling facility at Ararat.
 28 January 2020 - Construction begins on the upgrade of four level crossings on the Warrnambool Line.
 23 April 2020 - Donnybrook Station Upgrade completed, with addition of 150 new car parking spaces, new platform shelters and the city bound platform extended, improved pedestrian access, improved security with CCTV and lighting on platforms and in the car park.
 24 April 2020 - Works completed on four new level crossing boom gates along the Warrnambool Line.
 31 July 2020 - 3 new stations, named Huntly, Goornong, and Raywood, announced to be constructed on the Bendigo railway line, to be completed by 2022.
 12 December 2021 – Construction at Goornong Station finishes, and the station opens to the public.
 16 July 2022 – Construction at Huntly Station finishes, and the station opens to the public.
 17 July 2022 – Construction at Raywood Station finishes, and the station opens to the public.

See also
 Regional Fast Rail project - a prior project aimed at improving regional rail services across Victoria
 Regional Rail Link project - a prior project to separate regional V/Line services from the electrified Melbourne suburban services

References

External links
Regional Rail Revivial

Rail transport in Victoria (Australia)
Proposed rail infrastructure in Australia